Qareh Chay District is a district (bakhsh) in Khondab County, Markazi Province, Iran. At the 2006 census, its population was 33,420, in 8,846 families.  The District has one city Javersiyan. The District has three rural districts (dehestan): Enaj Rural District, Javersiyan Rural District, and Sang Sefid Rural District.

References 

Khondab County
Districts of Markazi Province